Poli Ejido 2012 Sociedad Deportiva was a Spanish football team based in El Ejido, Province of Almería, in the autonomous community of Andalusia. Founded in 1969 and dissolved in 2012, it held home matches at Estadio Municipal Santo Domingo, that seated 7,870 spectators.

The club played in pale blue shirts and white shorts, and spent seven seasons in Segunda División in the 2000s.

History
Polideportivo Ejido was founded in 1969. After first reaching the fourth division in 1987, the club fluctuated between that and the third levels. From 1999–2001 it achieved two consecutive promotions, and would go on to have an uninterrupted seven-year spell in the second division.

On 29 October 2008, freshly relegated to division three, Poli trounced La Liga giants Villarreal CF 5–0 in the fourth round of the Spanish Cup, the first with teams from the top level (6–1 final aggregate). Two seasons later the two clubs met again in the tournament, but with a different outcome (3–1 on aggregate for the Valencian club).

Polideportivo Ejido was expelled from the third division competition midway through the 2011–12 season, after failing to report to two consecutive games. Overwhelmed by financial difficulties and without any players, the club folded soon afterwards.

Seasons

Recent seasons
{|class="wikitable"
|-bgcolor="#efefef"
! Season
! 
! Pos.
! Pl.
! W
! D
! L
! GS
! GA
! P
!Cup
!Notes
|-
|2002–03
|2D
|align=right |13
|align=right|42||align=right|12||align=right|16||align=right|14
|align=right|36||align=right|45||align=right|52
||
|
|-
|2003–04
|2D
|align=right |18
|align=right|42||align=right|12||align=right|13||align=right|17
|align=right|29||align=right|40||align=right|49
||
|
|-
|2004–05
|2D
|align=right |13
|align=right|42||align=right|12||align=right|16||align=right|14
|align=right|41||align=right|45||align=right|52
||
|
|-
|2005–06
|2D
|align=right |15
|align=right|42||align=right|15||align=right|8||align=right|19
|align=right|43||align=right|50||align=right|53
||
|
|-
|2006–07
|2D
|align=right |10
|align=right|42||align=right|16||align=right|10||align=right|16
|align=right|52||align=right|50||align=right|58
||
|
|-
|2007–08
|2D
|align=right |22
|align=right|42||align=right|11||align=right|11||align=right|20
|align=right|37||align=right|54||align=right|44
||
|Relegated
|}

Season to season

7 seasons in Segunda División
9 seasons in Segunda División B
9 seasons in Tercera División

Last squad
''The numbers are established according to the official website:www.poliejido.com and www.rfef.es

Honours / Achievements
Tercera División: 1995–96, 1999–2000
Segunda División: Promotion 2000–01

Famous players
Note: this list includes players that have played at least 100 league games and/or have reached international status.

See also
Polideportivo Ejido B, reserve team

References

External links
Official website 
Futbolme team profile 

 
Defunct football clubs in Andalusia
Association football clubs established in 1969
Association football clubs disestablished in 2012
1969 establishments in Spain
2012 disestablishments in Spain
Segunda División clubs